Milton J. (Jack) Miller (1912 – March 6, 2007) was a business lawyer from Detroit, Michigan and co-founder of the law firm Honigman Miller Schwartz and Cohn.

Early life

Miller was born in Baltimore, Maryland in 1912 to immigrant parents. He grew up in Detroit and graduated from Detroit Central High School, the first public high school established in Detroit and in Michigan.  During his time at Detroit Central, he met his future wife, Jeanette Rabinowitz.  He graduated from the University of Michigan with an undergraduate degree in 1933.  Two years later, in 1935, he graduated, with honors, from the University of Michigan Law School with a Juris Doctor.

Law career 

In 1948, with Jason L. Honigman, he formed a law firm what is known today as Honigman Miller Schwartz and Cohn.  The firm has been headquartered in the First National Building since its founding, which is located in the heart of downtown Detroit directly facing Campus Martius Park.

In practice, he was primarily a business lawyer.  In addition to his business practice, he also headed the firm’s matrimonial / family law group.  As a family law practitioner, he represented many of Detroit’s social elite, including Henry Ford II in his divorce from Cristina Ford in 1980.

He was a lifelong member of the State Bar of Michigan as well as the International Society of Barristers.

Retirement and interests 

Although never formally retiring, he was actively involved in the day-to-day operations of the firm.  In his spare time, he was dedicated to his family and was an active tennis player even up to the time of his death.

He was deeply involved in many Jewish causes including the Jewish Federation of Metropolitan Detroit.  He was also active with the Detroit Symphony Orchestra.

Death 

Miller died at his home in Franklin, Michigan of pancreatic cancer.  He was 94 years old at the time of death.

In November 2007, Honigman Miller Schwartz and Cohn announced the Jack Miller Memorial Scholarship Fund at the University of Michigan Law School.  The fund provides a scholarship to a financially challenged first-year law student from the city of Detroit as well as an opportunity to work as a summer associate at Honigman Miller Schwartz and Cohn.  In establishing the fund, the firm’s chief officer, Alan S. Schwartz, was quoted as saying:
We are so proud to be able to celebrate Jack Miller’s amazing life and accomplishments with this gift.  This will ensure Jack’s legacy of caring, kindness, and generosity will live on forever.

References

External links 
In Memory of My Grandfather: A Giant Lost by Zack Miller

1912 births
2007 deaths
Lawyers from Baltimore
Lawyers from Detroit
University of Michigan Law School alumni
People from Franklin, Michigan
20th-century American lawyers